St John the Baptist's Chapel, Matlock Bath, is a former private chapel in Johns Road, off the A6 road between Matlock Bath and Matlock, Derbyshire, England.  The chapel, together with its retaining and attached walls, is recorded in the National Heritage List for England as a designated Grade II* listed building, and is under the care of the Friends of Friendless Churches.

History

The chapel was built in 1897 for Mrs Louisa Sophia Harris, and was designed by Guy Dawber; it was the only church designed by Dawber.  Since being declared redundant it has been taken into the care of the charity, the Friends of Friendless Churches, to whom the freehold was conveyed on 15 March 2002.  Since taking it over, the charity has arranged repairs, including rebuilding the gates and cleaning and repairing the chandeliers.

Architecture

The chapel is constructed in rubble carboniferous limestone with ashlar gritstone dressings.  Its plan consists of a single cell.  On its south side is a bell turret with a lead-covered pyramidal roof.  Also on the south side is an oriel window with mullioned lights.  The chapel is entered through a west doorway in a porch that is continued round the north side to form a covered walkway.  The internal fittings are in Arts and Crafts style.  The decorated barrel-vaulted plastered ceiling was designed by George Bankart, the stained glass at the east end by Louis Davis, and the painted altarpiece by John Cooke.  Dawber designed the perpendicular style rood screen, and probably the pulpit, pews, choir stalls and light fittings.

See also
Grade II* listed buildings in Derbyshire Dales
Listed buildings in Matlock Town

References

Further reading

Matlock Bath, St John the Baptist's Chapel
Matlock Bath, St John the Baptist's Chapel
Churches completed in 1897
19th-century churches in the United Kingdom
Arts and Crafts architecture in England
Former churches in Derbyshire